"Gente en la Calle" (English: "People in the Streets") is a song by Argentine singer-songwriter Fito Páez featuring vocals by Argentine singer Lali, from Páez's twenty-fourth studio album La Conquista del Espacio (2020). It was written by Páez and its producers Diego Olivero and Gustavo Borner. The track was released by Sony Music Argentina as the album's fourth single on March 4, 2021.

In 2021, the song received a nomination for the Collaboration of the Year award at the 23rd Annual Gardel Awards.

Background
The artists' relationship developed through the years as each of them showed interest in each other's work. In 2018, Lali covered Paez's 1990 song "Y Dale Alegría a Mi Corazón". Lali's version was part of a Spotify campaign in which some artists released songs in support of their homecountries' national football teams on the 2018 FIFA World Cup.

Moreover, Páez invited Lali to perform his song "Yo Vengo a Ofrecer Mi Corazón" with him in two occasions: the first time in 2018 at Teatro Gran Rex, Buenos Aires, and the second in 2019 at the Fillmore Theatre, Miami.

In 2020, Lali released her fourth studio album, Libra, which had Páez as songwriter and background vocalist of the last track, "Una Esquina en Madrid". According to Lali, she sent the lyrics to Páez after having written the song. In return, he sent her a video of himself "finding the melody" of the song in a piano.

Composition
In an interview with Billobard, Páez compared the song to Steely Dan's music, one of his favorite groups, and said that it is "melodically very difficult". He added that:

Music video
A music video directed by Guido Adler and Alejandro Ros premiered on March 4, 2021. In the clip, Lali and Páez interact in a street-like set with huge traffic lights in front of screens that project real-life images of Buenos Aires and people living in its streets.

Charts

Weekly charts

Year-end charts

See also
 List of airplay number-one hits in Argentina

References

2020 songs
2021 singles
Spanish-language songs
Latin pop songs
Latin rock songs
Lali Espósito songs
Sony Music singles